is a beat 'em up video game series initially developed by Technōs Japan and released as an arcade game in 1987. The series features twin martial artists, Billy and Jimmy Lee, as they fight against various adversaries and rivals.

The original Double Dragon was a blockbuster hit arcade game, ushering in a "Golden Age" for the beat 'em up genre, resulting in a flood of beat 'em ups during the late 1980s to 1990s that followed the conventions set by Double Dragon. Due to the popularity of the game series, a 1993 animated series and 1994 live-action film adaptation were produced; these adaptations were widely-panned by critics and audiences.

The franchise is now the property of Arc System Works, the company that ported the original Double Dragon to the Sega Master System console in 1988.

Game series
The first game, Double Dragon, was released in the arcades in 1987. A Nintendo Entertainment System version produced by Technōs was released in 1988, followed by a Game Boy version in 1990. Various licensed versions were also produced by other developers for gaming platforms such as the Master System, Atari 2600, Atari 7800, Genesis, Atari Lynx and for home computers.

Two Double Dragon sequels were released for the arcade: Double Dragon II: The Revenge in 1988 and Double Dragon 3: The Rosetta Stone in 1990. Like the original, Technōs produced versions for the NES (Double Dragon II: The Revenge in 1989 and Double Dragon III: The Sacred Stones in 1991, respectively).

In 1991, a game titled Double Dragon II, unrelated to its arcade and NES counterpart, was released for the Game Boy.

A fourth game in the main series was released exclusively for the Super NES in 1992, titled Super Double Dragon. It was the last game produced by the original team at Technōs.

The Game Gear game Double Dragon is not a port of the original arcade game, but is instead an entirely new entry in the series that has gameplay elements that are more similar to Streets of Rage.

In 1994, Tradewest released Double Dragon V: The Shadow Falls for the Super NES and Genesis in North America and Europe, a fighting game developed by Leland Interactive based on the Double Dragon animated TV series by Bohbot Entertainment. A Jaguar version was released by Telegames as well.

Another fighting game produced by Technōs, simply titled Double Dragon, was released for the Neo Geo arcade and home console in 1995. A Neo Geo CD version was also released, as well as a PlayStation version by Urban Plant. It was the last Double Dragon game produced by Technōs before the company went out of business.

In 2003, a remake of the original Double Dragon, titled Double Dragon Advance, was produced by Atlus and Million (the copyrights holder of the Double Dragon series at the time) for the Game Boy Advance.

In 2009, a remake was released for the Zeebo, developed by Brizo Interactive and published by Tectoy.

In 2011, another remake was released for the iPhone, developed by Brizo Interactive and published by Aksys Games.

WayForward Technologies developed Double Dragon Neon, a self-parody of the series. The game was released on September 11, 2012, for the PlayStation 3 on PlayStation Network; one day later for the Xbox 360 on Xbox Live; and was released for PC in the first quarter of 2014.

Double Dragon II: Wander of the Dragons, a 3D remake of the original Double Dragon II, was released on the Xbox Live Arcade by game developer Gravity in April 2013.

A compilation of the three arcade titles, titled Double Dragon Trilogy, was released by DotEmu in 2013 for iOS, Android, GOG and Steam platforms.

A new title in the series, titled Double Dragon IV (not to be confused with Super Double Dragon), was released in January 2017, for the PlayStation 4 and PC, respectively, and September 7 for the Nintendo Switch. It takes place shortly after Double Dragon II: The Revenge and uses an 8-bit artstyle, similar to the NES ports of the earlier entries of the series. The title was developed by Arc System Works and former Technos staff such as producer Takaomi Kaneko, director Yoshihisa Kishimoto, character designer Koji Ogata, composer Kazunaka Yamane and programmer Kei Oyama.

Other appearances and related games
 Super Spike V'Ball (NES) – the NES version which features Billy and Jimmy as playable characters.
 WWF Superstars (arcade) – features a cameo by Billy as one of the game's spectators.
 River City Ransom (NES) – the Double Dragon theme music plays during the battle against Randy and Andy, two characters based on Billy and Jimmy. The Japanese counterparts of Randy and Andy, Ryūichi and Ryūji, are recurring characters in the later Kunio-kun games. Abobo appears as a recurring enemy in the sequel, River City Ransom Underground.
 Battletoads/Double Dragon (NES, GB, Genesis, SNES) – a crossover game between the Double Dragon and Battletoads franchises.
 Voltage Fighter Gowcaizer (Neo Geo) – Burnov from the Neo Geo Double Dragon game makes a cameo as Captain Atlantis' opponent in his ending.
 Rage of the Dragons (Neo Geo) – an unofficial homage to Double Dragon produced by Evoga and Noise Factory in association with Playmore which become the current incarnation of SNK. The main characters are named Billy and Jimmy Lewis.
 Abobo's Big Adventure (PC) – an unofficial parody of various Nintendo Entertainment System titles, including Double Dragon, and starring Abobo as the main character.
 River City: Rival Showdown (3DS) – both Billy and Jimmy Lee are playable characters in the Double Dragon Duel mode.
 River City Girls (PC, Switch, PlayStation 4, PlayStation 5, Xbox One) – the Lee Brothers have two Dojos in River City, where the player characters can acquire new fighting moves from the brothers in exchange for money. Abobo appears as a boss in the game, Marian and Skullmageddon as shop keepers, and Burnov works as a bouncer.
 River City Girls 2 (PC, Switch, PlayStation 4, PlayStation 5, Xbox One, Xbox Series XS) – Marian appears as a playable character.

Related media
A Double Dragon comic book limited series loosely based on the games was published by Marvel Comics in 1991, which lasted six issues from July to December. The comic book was written by Dwayne McDuffie for the first four issues and by Tom Brevoort and Mike Kanterovich for the final two. It features original villains and a unique story that explains the brothers parentage.

Double Dragon is one of the video games featured in the manga, titled Rock'n Game Boy by Shigeto Ikehara, in Comic BomBom from October 1989 to December 1991.

A Double Dragon animated series was produced by DIC Animation City and Bohbot Entertainment, which originally aired in syndication on Bohbot's Amazin' Adventures block for two seasons from 1993 to 1995, lasting 26 episodes.

A film version of Double Dragon was released in theaters in 1994, directed by James Yukich and starring Scott Wolf and Mark Dacascos as the Lee brothers.

Recurring elements

Characters

Lee Brothers

For most of the series, players take control of martial artist William "Billy" Lee, who battles against various adversaries such as gang members and rival fighters. He is often assisted by his elder twin brother James "Jimmy" Lee, who usually serves as the second player's character in most of the games.

The duo were actually unnamed when the original arcade game was initially released in Japan, although the names Hammer and Spike were given to them in the cabinet and promotional flyer produced by Taito for the overseas version. The names Billy and Jimmy Lee were first established in the Famicom/NES version of the first game and consequently used in other console versions and tie-in products such as The Original Sound of Double Dragon soundtrack album, but were not actually used in the arcade versions until Double Dragon 3: The Rosetta Stone. Billy Lee's name comes from a combination of Bruce Lee's last name with the first name of his character Billy Lo from the movie Game of Death, while Jimmy is named after musician Jimmy Page.

Because of the differences between the arcade and console versions of the games, the designs of the Lee brothers tend to vary throughout the series. While the original arcade game has Player 1 controlling a blond-haired Lee brother dressed in a blue outfit and Player 2 as a brown-haired brother in red, the NES version had their hair and outfit colors switched around: Billy was now the brown-haired brother in blue, while Jimmy became the blond-haired brother in red. Super Double Dragon was the first game to have the Lee brothers sport different hairstyles during gameplay, with Billy being given a laid down hairstyle and Jimmy a spiky flat top, a design convention adopted by later games such as Double Dragon Advance and the smartphone versions, although some of the promotional art and in-game visuals for the earlier games (such as the ending photograph of Double Dragon II: The Revenge and the story sequences/character portraits of Double Dragon III: The Sacred Stones) had already depicted the Lee brothers with differing hairstyles. Other games such as the Neo Geo fighting game and Double Dragon Neon depict the Lee brothers as identical twins like in the first arcade game.

The two brothers are shown to be romantically interested in a young woman named Marian, a student in their dojo. The arcade version of the first game (along with most console versions) can end with both brothers fighting each other over Marian if two players reach the end together, with the survivor ultimately winning Marian's affections. The Famicom/NES version, which establishes Marian to be Billy's long-term girlfriend, changes the story so that Jimmy was actually the leader of the Black Warriors (a change made as a result of the lack of two-player cooperative play in that version) and was the one who orchestrated Marian's kidnapping.

Enemy characters
The enemy organization in the original Double Dragon are the Black Warriors gang, who are characterized as the dominant criminal organization in New York City after a nuclear war has left the city deprived of any law and order. Much like the Lee brothers themselves, the names of the gang members were established throughout the console versions of the series. The gang's original leader is the machine gun-toting Willy Mackey (commonly known simply as Willy), who wishes to acquire the knowledge of the Lee brothers' martial arts for himself and orders the kidnapping of Marian as ransom. Recurring members of the gang throughout the various versions of the first game include the thugs Williams and Rowper, dominatrix Linda and bald strongman Abobo. The arcade version also featured two unnamed head swaps of other characters (namely of Abobo and the Lee brothers) as end-stage bosses: although these characters were absent in the NES version, which instead introduced a unique enemy, a Chinese martial artist named Chin Taimei. The Lee brother head swap would later appear in the Mark III/Master System version released by Sega, where he was named Jeff.

The name of the gang would change in later games. While the arcade version of Double Dragon II: The Revenge had Willy and the Black Warriors retaliating against their earlier defeat by gunning down Marian, the Famicom version replaced Willy with a nameless fighter who led a mysterious armed group following the dissolution of the original Black Warriors. While unnamed in the Japanese version, the English localization of the NES version would refer to this organization as the Shadow Warriors (or the Black Shadow Warriors in the manual), a name later used for an unrelated enemy group in Super Double Dragon, as well as Willy's own gang in Double Dragon Advance. The Shadow Warriors was also the name of the villain group in the Double Dragon animated series and its tie-in game, Double Dragon V: The Shadow Falls, where they consisted almost entirely of new characters.

The names Williams and Rowper were derived from the characters played respectively by Jim Kelly and John Saxon in the movie Enter The Dragon. Other characters seem to follow a similar naming convention such as Linda, who shares her name with Bruce Lee's widow Linda Lee Cadwell, and the enemy character Bolo from Double Dragon II: The Revenge, who shares his name with actor Bolo Yeung.

Gameplay
The gameplay in most of the games takes place in a pseudo 3D perspective like in Renegade and later beat-'em-ups, in which the player character can move in four directions but are always facing left or right. The player can perform a variety of unarmed fighting techniques against their enemies, as well use melee weapons such as baseball bats and throwing knives normally obtained from enemies. In some installments, there are techniques that can be done in combination with another player.

Legacy
While not the first games in the genre, the original Double Dragon titles laid the foundations for modern beat 'em up games. They influenced the creation of titles such as Golden Axe, Ninja Gaiden and Final Fight, which firmly established beat 'em ups as a popular game genre.

Double Dragon ushered in a "Golden Age" for the beat 'em up genre that took it to new heights with its detailed set of martial arts attacks and its two-player cooperative gameplay. Double Dragon'''s success resulted in a flood of beat 'em ups in the late 1980s. Subsequent beat 'em ups during the late 1980s to 1990s followed the conventions set by Double Dragon.

Years later, original series creator Yoshihisa Kishimoto lamented the inconsistency in design and quality of the various versions and spin-offs of Double Dragon in games and other media. He attributed these failings to Technōs losing the control of the license and allowing a multitude of third parties to work on the franchise.

References

External links
 Double Dragon series director Yoshihisa Kishimoto 
Double Dragon series at MobyGames

 Double Dragon'' detailed knowledge

 
Arc System Works franchises
Side-scrolling beat 'em ups
Video game franchises
Video game franchises introduced in 1987
Video games about siblings
Video games adapted into comics
Video games adapted into films
Video games adapted into television shows